Russian spy poisoning may refer to:

 Poisoning of Alexander Litvinenko
 Poisoning of Alexei Navalny
 Poisoning of Sergei and Yulia Skripal

Poisoning and certain other consequences of external causes
Espionage in Russia